"Primary" is a song by English rock band The Cure, released as the sole single from their third studio album, Faith, in 1981.

Content 
The song is unusual in that both Simon Gallup and Robert Smith play bass, with the effects pedals on Smith's giving the leads a unique sound. There are no guitars (other than bass) or keyboards played in the song.

Release 
"Primary" was released as a single on 20 March 1981. It reached number 43 in the UK Singles Chart.

"Primary" was the first song by The Cure to be remixed as a separate extended mix for release on 12" single (and not co-released on other formats, in the way the 12" version of "A Forest" was also the album version appearing on Seventeen Seconds, for example). In fact, the original 12" extended mix is, to this day, still only available on the original 12" single, which has never been reproduced on any other album, making it quite a rare item. The main difference between the 7" mix (also the album mix) and the 12" mix is that the extended mix lengthens the instrumental introductions to the song's verses.

Track listing 
7"
 "Primary"
 "Descent"

12"
 "Primary (Extended)"
 "Descent"

Musicians

Robert Smith – vocals, bass
Simon Gallup – bass
Lol Tolhurst – drums

References

External links
 

The Cure songs
1981 singles
Songs written by Robert Smith (musician)
Songs written by Lol Tolhurst
Song recordings produced by Mike Hedges
1981 songs
Fiction Records singles
Songs written by Simon Gallup